Paroa is a settlement on the West Coast of the South Island of New Zealand, just south of Greymouth.   and the Hokitika Branch railway both run through Paroa.  This railway was originally a bush tramway that opened to Paroa from Greymouth in 1867 and was extended to Kumara in 1877.  It was converted into a railway in 1893, and this time, ran from Paroa to Hokitika rather than Kumara.

The New Zealand Ministry for Culture and Heritage gives a translation of "broad fortified village" for Pāroa.

Shantytown, to the south-east of Paroa, is a recreation of a typical 1880s West Coast gold mining town, built in 1971 and operating as a commercial tourist attraction.

Demographics

The statistical area of Rutherglen-Camerons, which at 12 square kilometres is larger than this settlement, had a population of 1,332 at the 2018 New Zealand census, an increase of 135 people (11.3%) since the 2013 census, and an increase of 261 people (24.4%) since the 2006 census. There were 513 households. There were 681 males and 654 females, giving a sex ratio of 1.04 males per female. The median age was 46.5 years (compared with 37.4 years nationally), with 255 people (19.1%) aged under 15 years, 192 (14.4%) aged 15 to 29, 657 (49.3%) aged 30 to 64, and 231 (17.3%) aged 65 or older.

Ethnicities were 95.7% European/Pākehā, 8.8% Māori, 1.1% Pacific peoples, 2.3% Asian, and 0.7% other ethnicities (totals add to more than 100% since people could identify with multiple ethnicities).

The proportion of people born overseas was 10.4%, compared with 27.1% nationally.

Although some people objected to giving their religion, 50.7% had no religion, 40.8% were Christian, 0.2% were Buddhist and 0.7% had other religions.

Of those at least 15 years old, 138 (12.8%) people had a bachelor or higher degree, and 246 (22.8%) people had no formal qualifications. The median income was $37,500, compared with $31,800 nationally. The employment status of those at least 15 was that 582 (54.0%) people were employed full-time, 183 (17.0%) were part-time, and 15 (1.4%) were unemployed.

Education
Paroa School is a coeducational full primary (years 1-8) school with a decile rating of 6 and a roll of 172. The school originally accepted year 1-6 pupils only, but changed to include year 7 and 8 students in 2001.

Climate

References

External links
Shantytown

Grey District
Populated places in the West Coast, New Zealand